The 1994 Alabama gubernatorial election was held on November 8, 1994, to select the governor of Alabama. The election saw Republican Fob James defeat Democratic incumbent Governor Jim Folsom Jr. in an upset.

Democratic primary
The Democratic primary saw Jim Folsom defeat Paul Hubbert for the Democratic nomination. Lieutenant Governor Folsom became governor on April 22, 1993, after Republican Governor H. Guy Hunt was removed from office.

Candidates
 Tom Hayden
 Paul Hubbert, Executive Secretary of the Alabama Education Association and nominee for governor in 1990
 Jim Folsom Jr., incumbent Governor
 F. Ross Stewart

Results

Republican primary
Fob James defeated five other candidates for the Republican nomination.

Candidates
 Ann Bedsole, State Senator
 Winton Blount III, businessman and son of former Postmaster General Winton Blount
 Fob James, former Democratic Governor
 Mickey Kirkland, pastor
 Jack Pollard, candidate for governor in 1990
 Robin Swift, businessman

Results

General election results

Polling

Results
Folsom led in the polls during the campaign which showed him 10 to 12 percent ahead of James on the last weekend before the election. However, James pulled off a narrow upset victory in the election.

References

Recent Alabama gubernatorial election results

1994
Alabama
Gubernatorial